Harry Madison (7 September 1909 – 31 July 1995) was a Canadian wrestler. He competed in the men's freestyle light heavyweight at the 1932 Summer Olympics.

Championships and accomplishments
 Ray LaMontagne Promotions
 NWA World Junior Heavyweight Championship (Quebec version) (4 times)

References

External links
Harry Madison at Cagematch.net
Harry Madison at WrestlingData.com

1909 births
1995 deaths
Canadian male sport wrestlers
Olympic wrestlers of Canada
Wrestlers at the 1932 Summer Olympics
People from Verdun, Quebec
Sportspeople from Montreal
20th-century Canadian people